111 George Street is a building on George Street in the Brisbane CBD, Queensland, Australia which was completed in 1993. The building is owned, managed and occupied by the Queensland Government. With its repetitive grill pattern, it is sometimes colloquially referred to as the 'cheese grater'. A sister project known as 33 Charlotte Street was later built on the adjoining site, and has a very similar façade. This smaller building is 75 m high and was completed in September 2004.

As with all Queensland Government assets, the Department of Housing and Public Works manages the building on a day-to-day basis.

Tenants
111 George Street is currently occupied by three departments of the Queensland Government:

Department of Child Safety, Youth and Women (the Office of the Director-General is housed at 1 William Street) 
 Department of Communities, Disability Services and Seniors (the Office of the Director-General is housed at 1 William Street)
 Arts Queensland

The building used to be occupied by additional departments of the Queensland Government, which have since moved to other buildings or 1 William Street, where most executive branch and executive-level units are housed.

See also

 List of tallest buildings in Brisbane

References

External links

Skyscrapers in Brisbane
Office buildings completed in 1993
Office buildings in Brisbane
George Street, Brisbane
Skyscraper office buildings in Australia
1993 establishments in Australia